Theodor Lennström (born August 8, 1994) is a Swedish professional ice hockey defenceman. He is currently playing under contract with Färjestad BK of the Swedish Hockey League (SHL).

Playing career
Undrafted, Lennström made his Swedish Hockey League debut playing with AIK IF during the 2013–14 SHL season.

Following his second season with Färjestad BK in 2018–19, Lennström left at the conclusion of his contract, signing a two-year deal with reigning champions, Frölunda HC on 8 May 2019. In the 2019–20 season, Lennström matched his previous season totals with three goals and 15 points in just 31 games before the season was abruptly ended due to COVID-19.

Attracting NHL interest, Lennström left the SHL to sign a one-year, entry-level contract with the Edmonton Oilers on 29 April 2020. With the pandemic delaying the  North American season, Lennström opted to continue to play in Sweden on loan from the Oilers by returning to Frölunda HC on 21 July 2020. He produced four goals and 8 points in just 18 games before leaving the SHL and returning to the Oilers organization. Assigned to AHL affiliate, the Bakersfield Condors, Lennström made 19 appearances and collected 7 points in the regular season. He added three assists in the Pacific Conference Playoffs with the Condors before leaving the Oilers as a free agent.

On 3 August 2021, Lennström opted to continue his career in the Kontinental Hockey League (KHL), agreeing to a one-year contract with Russian club, Torpedo Nizhny Novgorod. In the 2021–22 season, Lennström registered nine goals and 18 assists for 27 points in 40 regular season games. Unable to help Torpedo qualify for the postseason for the first time in nine years, Lennström continued his season by returning to his former club, Färjestad BK of the SHL, on 12 February 2022.

Career statistics

Regular season and playoffs

International

Awards and honours

References

External links
 

1994 births
Living people
AIK IF players
Bakersfield Condors players
BIK Karlskoga players
Färjestad BK players
Frölunda HC players
Ice hockey players at the 2022 Winter Olympics
Olympic ice hockey players of Sweden
Swedish ice hockey defencemen
Torpedo Nizhny Novgorod players
Ice hockey people from Stockholm